Azougui (or Azuggi) was a town in north western Mauritania, lying on the Adrar Plateau, north west of Atar.  In the eleventh century it was the first capital of the Almoravid dynasty, who conquered a territory stretching from the Ghana Empire to Morocco and the Iberian Peninsula.  

The chronicler al-Bakri claims a fortress "surrounded by 20,000 palms" was built here by Yannu ibn Umar, a brother of the first Almoravid chieftains, Yahya ibn Umar al-Lamtuni and Abu Bakr ibn Umar, and marked the frontier between the dominions of the Lamtuna and the Gudala.  Both of them Berber Sanhaja desert tribes and one time allies, the Lamtuna formed the core of the Almoravids after the Gudala broke away. It was near this location, at a place called Tabfarilla, that the early Almoravids suffered their first significant defeat, when the Gudala crushed an Almoravid Lamtuna army based in Azuggi and killed their leader Yahya ibn Umar in 1056.  Azuggi and the nearby battlefield subsequently became a revered site for the Almoravids. The chronicler al-Zuhri, writing in the 1150s, called Azuggi the "capital of the Almoravids". 

Al-Idrisi identified Azougi as an essential stop on the trans-Saharan trade route between Morocco and Ghana ("Whoever wants to go to the countries of Sila, Takrur and Ghana in the land of the Sudan cannot avoid this town").  He also notes that the "Guineans" (prob. Soninke) called it "Quqadam".

The site is even older, as seventh century rock carvings attest.  Parts of the citadel and the necropolis of al-Imam al-Hadrami survive.

World Heritage Status 
This site was added to the UNESCO World Heritage Tentative List on June 14, 2001 in the Cultural category.

External links

 Paysage culturel d'Azougui - UNESCO World Heritage Centre

References 

 Levtzion, N. and J.F.P. Hopkins, editors, (1981) Corpus of Early Arabic Sources for West African History. Cambridge, UK: Cambridge University Press. 2000 edition.
 Mohamed Salem Ideidbi, Mauritanie. La richesse d'une nation, Nouakchott, al-Manar, 2011.
 Mohamed Salem Ideidbi, Traité de Politique ou Conseils pour la conduite du pouvoir d'al-Imam al-Hadrami (Cadi d'Azougui, Paris, Geuthner, 2012.

History of Mauritania
Almoravid dynasty
Former populated places in Mauritania
Archaeological sites in Mauritania
Adrar Region
Archaeological sites of Western Africa